The 1992 season was Molde's 18th season in the top flight of Norwegian football. This season Molde competed in Tippeligaen and the Norwegian Cup.

In Tippeligaen, Molde finished in 6th position, 10 points behind winners Rosenborg. 

Molde participated in the 1992 Norwegian Cup. They reached the third round where they were knocked out by third tier side Melhus after losing 1–2 at home ground.

Squad
Source:

 (on loan from Oldham Athletic)

Friendlies

Competitions

Tippeligaen

Results summary

Positions by round

Results

League table

Norwegian Cup

Squad statistics

Appearances and goals
Lacking information:
Appearance statistics from Norwegian Cup rounds 1–2 (6–9 players in first round, 1–4 players in second round) are missing.

  
  
    

 

  

|}

Goalscorers

See also
Molde FK seasons

References

External links
nifs.no

1992
Molde